The third season of the animated sitcom Home Movies originally began airing in the United States on the Adult Swim programming block for the television network Cartoon Network from August 4, 2002 to May 25, 2003. Co-creators Brendon Small and Loren Bouchard, along with Tom Sydner, served as executive producers for the season. Small and Bill Braudis acted as writers for the season, while Bouchard was director for each episode.

The series follows the life and adventures of 8-year-old aspiring filmmaker, Brendon Small, who writes, directs, and stars in homemade film productions that he creates with his friends Melissa Robbins and Jason Penopolis. Brendon and Melissa's soccer coach, John McGuirk, is a short-tempered and selfish alcoholic who gives the two morally bankrupt advice. Brendon's mother, Paula, meanwhile, is divorced and juggling her children, her job as a creative writing teacher, and her romantic life.

The main cast for the season consisted of Small, Janine Ditullio, H. Jon Benjamin, and Melissa Bardin Galsky. Among the guest stars during the season were Todd Barry and Mitch Hedberg, along with Louis C.K., who portrayed Brendon's father Andrew. A lot of the season featured "retroscripting," with the voice actors improvising much of their dialogue.

The episode "Shore Leave" won the Pulcinella award for "Best TV Series for Young Adults & Adults," while the season itself won in the category for "Best Group of Characters of the Year" at the same ceremony.

The complete season DVD was released by Shout! Factory on November 15, 2005, a few months after the release of the second season DVD. It contained all thirteen episodes along with an assortment of bonus features, including optional episode commentary and animatics.

Episodes

Home release 
The DVD boxset for season three was released by Shout! Factory on November 15, 2005. Other than all thirteen episodes of the season, the DVD included several bonus features, including interviews with the cast and crew, animatics, an animation gallery, commentary tracks on seven episodes, and a radio interview with Bouchard and Benjamin.

See also 
 Home Movies
 List of Home Movies episodes

References

External links 

2002 American television seasons
2003 American television seasons
Home Movies (TV series) seasons